Stephen Shames (born 1947, in Cambridge, Massachusetts) is an American photojournalist who for over 50 years has used his photography to raise awareness of social issues, with a particular focus on child poverty, solutions to child poverty, and race. He testified about child poverty to the United States Senate in 1986. Shames was named a Purpose Prize Fellow in 2010 by Encore.org for his work helping AIDS orphans and former child soldiers in Africa.

Photography
Shames is the author of fifteen photography book monographs, including: Comrade Sisters: Women of the Black Panther Party (ACC Art Books, 2022) co-authored with Ericka Huggins,Stephen Shames, Une Retrospective (Maison de la Photographie Robert Doisneau de Gentilly), Power to the People: The World of the Black Panthers (Abrams, 2016), co-authored with Bobby Seale, Outside the Dream: Child Poverty in America (Aperture), Pursuing the Dream: What Helps Children and Their Families Succeed(Aperture), The Black Panthers (Aperture), Bronx Boys (University of Texas Press, 2014), Facing Race, Free to Grow, and Transforming Lives; and an electronic book Bronx Boys (FotoEvidence, 2011). Shames wrote and directed two videos: Friends of the Children and Children of Northern Uganda. 

Shames is represented in the United States by Steven Kasher in New York City. Shames is represented in Europe by the Galerie Esther Woerdehoff in Paris and Geneva. He is affiliated with Polaris Images photo agency in New York.

Shames’ images are in the permanent collections of 40 international museums and collection, including: the Metropolitan Museum of Art, New York; Museum of Modern Art, New York; International Center of Photography, New York; National Portrait Gallery, Washington, D.C.; Dolph Briscoe Center for American History at the University of Texas, Austin, Texas;Museum of Photographic Arts, San Diego; University of California's Bancroft Library, Berkeley; San Jose Museum of Art; Museum of Fine Arts, Houston; San Francisco Museum of Modern Art, San Francisco; the Schomburg Center for Research in Black Culture, New York; the National Museum of African American History and Culture, Washington, DC; and the Foundation Sindika Dokolo, Luanda, Angola. 

Shames has exhibited at Kyotographie International Photography Festival, Kyoto, Japan; Metropolitan Museum of Art; National Museum of African American History and Culture; National Portrait Gallery; Schomburg Center for Research in Black Culture; Pingyao International Photo Festival, Pingyao, China; Photo London; Paris Photo; Fondation Manuel Rivera-Ortiz in Arles; National Park Service on Alcatraz Island; Musée Nicéphore-Niépce, Chalon-sur-Saône, France; Maison de la photographie Robert Doisneau, Gentilly, France; Du Sable Museum of African American History, Chicgao; International Center of Photography, New York; Oakland Museum of CA; Sam Jose Museum of Art; Aperture Foundation; CA2M  Centro de Arte Dos de Mayo, Madrid, Spain; Chop Museum,  National University of Mexico, Mexico City; Slavery & Justice Center, Brown University, Providence; Zimmerli Art Museum at Rutgers, New Brunswick, NJ; Bozar/Paleis voor Schone Kunsten, Brussels; and scores of other venues.

All of Shames' negatives and contact sheets, notes, and 1,000 prints are housed at the Dolph Briscoe Center for American History at the University of Texas, Austin.

He has received the Kodak Crystal Eagle Award for Impact in Photojournalism, and awards from Leica, International Center of Photography, Robert F. Kennedy Journalism Awards, World Press, and the New York Art Director's Club, American Photo / Pop Photo named Shames one of the 15 most underrated masters of photography.

Child poverty work
From 1984 to 1989, with support from the Children's Defense Fund and the Alicia Patterson Foundation, Shames traveled across America photographing the lives of the one out of five children in the United States who live below the poverty line.  The photographs were published by Aperture in 1991 as Outside the Dream with an introduction by Jonathan Kozol. 
Shames' work documenting child poverty was also featured in the New York Times, 
as well as the Los Angeles Times.

Senator Bill Bradley said about the work: “Just as Walker Evans’ photographs helped America see the poverty of Appalachia, the vivid images in Outside the Dream will open our hearts to the deprivation that today afflicts not a region, but an entire generation.”  
In 1993, copies of Outside the Dream were distributed to every member of Congress, the governors of all 50 states, selected state legislators, and the chief executive officers of the Fortune 500 companies.

From 1994 to 1996, with support from the Ford Foundation and the Charles Stewart Mott Foundation, Shames worked on a follow-up project to Outside the Dream that focused on community solutions to child poverty in America. The work was published in 1997 as Pursuing the Dream: What Helps Children and Their Families Succeed and includes a preface by Michael Jordan. Shames traveled across America documenting families participating in neighborhood programs where parents were empowered to learn the skills they needed to become better parents, get better jobs, and become role models for their children.
President Jimmy Carter wrote about the book: “Stephen Shames has captured the spirit of thousands of programs across our country that are quietly but stubbornly making the lives of children and families better in spite of the bleak circumstances in which they live. … This book can inspire all of us to seek out the many opportunities already available in their own communities to make a difference in the lives of others.”

Humanitarian work in Africa
In 2006, Shames founded L.E.A.D Uganda, an NGO in Africa that locates forgotten children (AIDS orphans, former child soldiers, child laborers, and children living in Internally Displaced Person camps) and molds them into leaders by sending them to the best schools and colleges. One of the students was highlighted in a People Magazine feature in 2007. In 2012 Shames retired as executive director and returned to photography full-time.

Current Work: Exhibits, Books, and Climate Change
Shames is currently working on exhibitions and books highlighting his previous work including the 1960s, Children & Youth, and a Retrospective.

In 2018 Shames produced The Water Bottle Project, a set of 42 glass water bottles with photographs on the labels. The idea of the Water Bottle Project is to create an art object that will remind us of the importance of water to our lives and the life of our planet. Labels featuring photographs of water use around the world on water bottles contrast images of water use with bottled water as an expensive commodity.

Without water we die—along with all land based plants and animals. Today access to clean water is in jeopardy. Today approximately one billion people lack access to safe water and over 2.5 billion lack access to adequate sanitation. It will get worse. By 2025 more than half of the people of the world will face water vulnerability. The Water Bottle Project creates an art object that reminds us  we need to take action.

Books
 "Comrade Sisters: Women of the BlackPanther Party" (ACC Art Books 2022 )
 "Power to the People: The World of the Black Panthers" (Abrams, 2016)
 "Outside the Dream: Child Poverty in America" (Aperture 1991)
 "Pursuing the Dream: What Helps Children and Their Families Succeed" (Aperture 1997)
 "Bronx Boys" (University of Texas Press, 2014)
 "The Black Panthers" (Aperture 2006)
 "Facing Race" (Moravian College, 2008)
 "Stephen Shames,Une Retrospective" (Maison de la Photographie Robert Doisneu de Gentilly | Red Eye, 2017)
 "Some People" (Quiddity, 2021)
 "from the 4 corners of the earth: Multiracial Americans"  (Quiddity, 2021)
 "We Are America"  (Quiddity  2021)* "Free to Grow" (Columbia University, 2003)
 "Transforming Lives" (Star Bright Books 2009)
 "Bronx Boys" electronic book (FotoEvidence, 2013)

See also
 List of artists from Brooklyn

References

American photojournalists
Artists from Cambridge, Massachusetts
Living people
1947 births
University of California, Berkeley alumni